Enkitta Modhaade  is a 2018-2019 Tamil reality game show that aired on Vijay TV and digitally streams on Disney+ Hotstar. The show features Vijay TV's soap opera families in which the actors will compete in a number of entertainment based challenges. The show has currently entered the second season. The first season aired from 21 April 2018 to 14 July 2018. The first episode of the second season aired on 19 May 2019. The show is hosted by  Dhivyadharshini.

Series overview

Episode list

Season 1

Season 2

Adaptations

References

External links
Vijay TV Official Website on Hotstar

Star Vijay original programming
Tamil-language television shows
Tamil-language reality television series
Tamil-language game shows
2018 Tamil-language television series debuts
2018 Tamil-language television seasons
2019 Tamil-language television seasons
2019 Tamil-language television series endings